The 1996 NCAA Division I women's volleyball tournament began with 48 teams and ended on December 21, 1996, when Stanford defeated Hawaii 3 games to 0 in the NCAA championship match.

Stanford's win over Hawaii for the title was, and remains, one of the most lopsided finals in NCAA championship history. Stanford won 15-7, 15-3, 15-5. The 15 points scored by Hawaii was the lowest in an NCAA championship match since the NCAA tournament began in 1981.

Play-in games

Records

Brackets

Pacific regional

East regional

Mountain regional

Central regional

Final Four - CSU Convocation Center, Cleveland, Ohio

See also
NCAA Women's Volleyball Championship

References

NCAA Women's Volleyball Championship
NCAA
Volleyball in Ohio
1996 in sports in Ohio
December 1996 sports events in the United States
Sports competitions in Cleveland